Chester McGlockton (September 16, 1969 – November 30, 2011) was an American football defensive tackle who played for four teams in his twelve-season National Football League career from 1992 to 2003.

Early years
McGlockton was a High School All-American as a Tight End/linebacker at Whiteville High School in Whiteville, North Carolina. He played Varsity Football all four years. During his senior year, he led the Whiteville Wolfpack to a 15-0 record, a State Championship, and a USA Today National Ranking.

College career
He played college football at Clemson University under Danny Ford and Ken Hatfield. He scored a touchdown as a freshman in the 1989 Gator Bowl vs. the West Virginia Mountaineers.

Professional career
McGlockton was drafted by the Los Angeles Raiders in the 1st round (16th overall) of the 1992 NFL Draft. He played six seasons with the Raiders, earning all four of his Pro Bowl appearances with them. McGlockton also played for the Kansas City Chiefs, the Denver Broncos, and ended his career by playing one season with the New York Jets. McGlockton finished his NFL career with 51 sacks including a career season high of 9.5 in 1994.

NFL stats

Post-football
At the start of 2009, he was an intern coach with the University of Tennessee football team. He accepted a defensive assistant position at Stanford in 2010 and worked on David Shaw's staff.

Death
McGlockton died of the consequences of left ventricular hypertrophy on November 30, 2011.

References

1969 births
2011 deaths
People from Whiteville, North Carolina
American football defensive tackles
American Conference Pro Bowl players
Clemson Tigers football players
Denver Broncos players
Kansas City Chiefs players
New York Jets players
Oakland Raiders players
Los Angeles Raiders players
Stanford Cardinal football coaches
Players of American football from North Carolina